Ernst Heinrich Lindemann (25 January 1833– 8 May 1900) was German politician and mayor of Essen, Dortmund and Düsseldorf. His grandson Kapitän zur See Ernst Lindemann was the commander of the battleship Bismarck.

Lindemann was the son of the Theologian Heinrich Lindemann (1805–1861) who was the pastor of Kirchlegern since 1832. Lindemann studied law at the universities in Bonn, Heidelberg and Berlin from 1851 to 1854. He was elected mayor of Essen in December 1858. He held this office nine years from 1859 to 1868. He resigned from office and worked as a bank director of the Westdeutschen Versicherungs-Aktienbank and then as general director of the Bochumer Verein für Bergbau und Gußstahlfabrikation (BVG), an iron factory, belonging to Friedrich Grillo.

The father of three sons and two daughters died on 8 May 1900. His oldest son, Georg Heinrich Ernst Lindemann, was the father of the Captain of the battleship Bismarck, Otto Ernst Lindemann.

References
Citations

Bibliography

 Grützner, Jens (2010). Kapitän zur See Ernst Lindemann: Der Bismarck-Kommandant - Eine Biographie (in German). VDM Heinz Nickel. .
 Weidenhaupt, Hugo (1993). Kleine Geschichte der Stadt Düsseldorf. 9. Auflage. Triltsch, Düsseldorf, .

1833 births
1900 deaths
Mayors of Düsseldorf
Mayors of Dortmund
Members of the Prussian House of Lords
Mayors of Essen